Ro-34 was a Kaichū type submarine of the K6 sub-class built for the Imperial Japanese Navy. Completed and commissioned in May 1937, she served in World War II, operating in the South China Sea and the Netherlands East Indies, off New Guinea, and in the Solomon Islands. She was sunk in April 1943 during her eleventh war patrol.

Design and description
The submarines of the K5 sub-class were versions of the preceding KT sub-class with greater surface speed. They displaced  surfaced and  submerged.

For surface running, the boats were powered by two  diesel engines, each driving one propeller shaft. When submerged each propeller was driven by a  electric motor. They could reach  on the surface and  underwater.

The boats were armed with four internal bow  torpedo tubes and carried a total of ten torpedoes. They were also armed with a single  L/40 anti-aircraft gun and one  Type 93 anti-aircraft machinegun.

Construction and commissioning

Given the name Ro-34 on 21 April 1934, Ro-34 was laid down on 25 April 1934 by Mitsubishi at Kobe, Japan, as the second and last submarine of the Ro-33 class. She was launched on 12 December 1935 and was completed and commissioned on 31 May 1937.

Service history

Pre-World War II
Upon commissioning, Ro-34 was attached to the Sasebo Naval District and assigned to the new Submarine Division 21 along with her sister ship . On 9 April 1938 she got underway from Sasebo, Japan, for a training cruise in southern Chinese waters with Ro-33 that concluded with their arrival at Kīrun, Formosa, on 14 April 1938. Submarine Division 21 was reassigned to the Combined Fleet on 15 December 1938 and to Submarine Squadron 2 in the 2nd Fleet on 8 April 1939.

In August 1939, Ro-34 departed Yokosuka, Japan, to conduct a research cruise to Saipan in the Mariana Islands with the commander of Submarine Division 21 and a nutritionist from Tokyo Imperial University embarked. The scientific aims of the cruise were to study the effect on the crew′s health of prolonged confinement aboard the submarine and of the crew′s diet while on board. Dysentery broke out among the crew during the voyage, necessitating dietary changes. Ro-34 returned to Yokosuka at the conclusion of the cruise. Ro-34 was placed in the Second Reserve in the Sasebo Naval District on 15 November 1939.

Ro-34 returned to active service on 1 May 1940, with Submarine Division 21 reassigned to Submarine Squadron 5 in the 4th Fleet. She departed Sasebo on 16 May 1940 for a lengthy training cruise with Ro-33 in the Caroline Islands, Marshall Islands, and Mariana Islands which concluded with their arrival at Yokosuka on 22 September 1940. She participated in a naval review at Yokohama, Japan, on 11 October 1940. Submarine Division 21 was reassigned to Submarine Squadron 4 on 15 November 1940.

Ro-33 and Ro-34 were placed in Third Reserve at Sasebo, Japan, on 15 May 1941, and while in reserve Ro-33 relieved Ro-34 as flagship of Submarine Division 21 on 21 May 1941. From mid-October through early November 1941 Ro-33 and Ro-34 underwent repairs and a refit at Maizuru Naval Arsenal in Maizuru, Japan. After the work was complete, the two submarines returned to active service, probably in mid-November 1941.

World War II
The Pacific Campaign of World War II began on 7 December 1941 (8 December 1941 in East Asia) with the Japanese attack on Pearl Harbor, Hawaii. At 16:00 on 18 December 1941, Submarine Division 21 — Ro-33 and Ro-34 — departed Sasebo bound for Cam Rahn Bay in Japanese-occupied French Indochina, which Ro-33 reached on 24 December 1941. During her stay at Cam Ranh Bay, she refueled from the depot ship  and her crew was granted three days of shore leave.

First war patrol
On 28 December 1941, Ro-34 got underway from Cam Ranh Bay to begin her first war patrol, assigned an operating area in the Karimata Strait in support of the Japanese invasion of British Malaya. Her patrol was uneventful, and she returned to Cam Ranh Bay on 11 January 1942.

Second war patrol
On 31 January 1942, Ro-34 departed Cam Ranh Bay for her second war patrol, bound for a patrol area in the Java Sea at the northern entrance of the Lombok Strait. She received orders on 2 February 1942 to move to a new patrol area at the northern entrance of the Sunda Strait. On 5 February 1942, she was in the Java Sea northeast of the Sunda Strait when she sighted an Allied task force consisting of the Royal Navy heavy cruiser , the Royal Australian Navy light cruiser , and the Royal Navy destroyer , which her commanding officer misidentified as a convoy of merchant ships escorted by a cruiser and a destroyer. Ro-34 made an unsuccessful approach for an attack but fired four torpedoes anyway at the nearest ship, Encounter. All missed, but Ro-34′s sound operator reported hearing four hits, apparently mistaking the sound of exploding depth charges for the detonation of the torpedoes, and Ro-34′s commanding officer erroneously claimed to have sunk a destroyer. After a brief counterattack by the ships, Ro-34 escaped unscathed.

While Ro-34 was at sea, Submarine Division 21 was reassigned to Submarine Group A on 9 February 1942. Out of torpedoes, and with the submarine  relieving her on station, Ro-34 received orders to return to Cam Ranh Bay, which she reached on 20 February 1942.

Third war patrol
Ro-34 began her third war patrol on 27 February 1942, putting to sea from Cam Ranh Bay bound for a patrol area in the Indian Ocean south of Java and southeast of the Lombok Strait and Tjilatjap, Java, to support the upcoming Japanese invasion of Java. In early March 1942, she was on the surface off Noesa Kembang lighthouse on Kambangan Island south of Tjilatjap when she sighted a patrolling Allied corvette. During several attempts to break free, she depleted her batteries, and after sunset her commanding officer ordered her to surface and engage the corvette with her deck gun. She broke free of the net in the process of surfacing, and came to the surface in the midst of group of fishing boats. The corvette had left the area, as did Ro-34, recharging her batteries while heading out to sea at flank speed. She concluded her patrol with her arrival at Staring Bay on the coast of Celebes in the Netherlands East Indies on 7 March 1942.

March–April 1942

On 10 March 1942, Submarine Squadron 4 was disbanded, and Submarine Division 21 — Ro-33 and Ro-34 — was reassigned to Submarine Squadron 6 in the 4th Fleet, and on 20 March 1942 Ro-34 relieved Ro-33 as flagship of Submarine Division 21. The two submarines departed Staring Bay on 22 March 1942, called at Palau from 26 to 30 March 1942, and then headed for Truk, which they reached on 3 April 1942. On 4 April 1942, Submarine Division 21 was reassigned to the South Seas Force. Submarine Squadron 4 was disbanded on 10 April 1942, and that day Submarine Division 21 was reassigned to Submarine Squadron 7 in the 4th Fleet. The two submarines departed Truk on 15 April 1942, and on 18 April 1942 they arrived at Rabaul on New Britain.

Fourth war patrol

Ro-34 departed Rabaul on 19 April 1942 to begin her third war patrol, with orders to conduct a reconnaissance of anchorages and transit routes in the Deboyne Islands and the Jomard Channel and at Rossel Island. She returned to Rabaul on 24 April 1942.

Fifth war patrol — Operation Mo

On 1 May 1942, Ro-33 relieved Ro-34 as flagship of Submarine Division 21, and that day Ro-34 departed Rabaul to begin her fifth war patrol, bound along with Ro-33 for the Coral Sea off Port Moresby on the southeastern coast of New Guinea to support Operation Mo, a planned Japanese invasion of Tulagi in the Solomon Islands and Port Moresby. While they were en route, the Battle of the Coral Sea began on 4 May 1942 as Allied forces moved to block the Japanese offensive. As the battle continued, the two submarines arrived off Port Moresby on 5 May 1942. The Japanese seized Tulagi and were turned back from Port Moresby, and when Operation Mo was cancelled on 19 May 1942, Ro-34 departed her patrol area to proceed to Truk, where she met .

May–July 1942
On 23 May 1942, Ro-33 and Ro-34 departed Truk bound for Sasebo, where they arrived on 30 May 1944. Both submarines underwent repairs and an overhaul at Sasebo, and after the work was completed, they left Sasebo on 9 July 1942, called at Truk from 17 to 23 July 1942, and proceeded to Rabaul, arriving there on 27 July 1942.

Sixth war patrol

On 29 July 1942, Ro-34 began her sixth war patrol, putting to sea from Rabaul to head for a patrol area in the Coral Sea off the Cape York Peninsula in northeastern Australia. After World War II, some Japanese historians credited her with attacking the Australian troopship Katoomba on 4 August 1942, but it was the submarine  that actually made that attack.

On 7 August 1942, Ro-34 was headed back to Rabaul after a quiet patrol when the Guadalcanal campaign began with U.S. amphibious landings on Guadalcanal, Tulagi, Florida Island, Gavutu, and Tanambogo in the southeastern Solomon Islands.

Ro-34 arrived off Tulagi on 10 August 1942. At 18:00 on 12 August 1942, she contacted Japanese forces at Taivu Point on Guadalcanal′s northern coast, then briefly bombarded United States Marine Corps positions at Lungga Point, also on the northern coast of Guadalcanal, with her deck gun. She returned to Rabaul on 16 August 1942.

Seventh war patrol

Ro-34 put to sea from Rabaul on 21 August 1942 to begin her seventh war patrol, ordered to conduct a reconnaissance of the Guadalcanal area. While she was at sea, she was reassigned to Submarine Squadron 7 in the Advance Force on 22 August 1942, and on 23 August she received orders to attack an Allied supply convoy — the United States Navy attack cargo ships  and  — which Japanese forces had reported arriving at Guadalcanal on 22 August.

Ro-34 approached the anchorage at Lungga Roads off Lungga Point on the evening of 23 August 1942 and sighted what her commanding officer identified as a 10,000-ton transport unloading there and a destroyer and a corvette conducting defensive patrols. At 18:27, Ro-34 fired two torpedoes at the transport and her crew heard an explosion, prompting her commanding officer to claim that she had sunk a transport. A nearby Imperial Japanese Army observation post identified her target as a destroyer, which may have been the fast transport , which reported dodging a torpedo a submarine had fired at her and then counterattacking the submarine. Both of Ro-34′s torpedoes missed, and one of them later was found on a beach on the coast of Guadalcanal. With Allied ships in pursuit, Ro-34 headed out to sea, undergoing heavy depth-charging during an  chase. The depth charges knocked out her internal lighting and caused her to take a 15-degree up-angle, but she broke contact and escaped with little damage except for a leak in one periscope shaft.

Ro-34 looked for Allied shipping in the harbor at Tulagi on 26 August 1942. At 01:34 on 28 August 1942, she was on the surface when she sighted what she identified as a U.S. Navy submarine moving slowly on the surface off Cape Esperance on the northwestern coast of Guadalcanal. She submerged and fired two torpedoes, subsequently hearing two explosions and claiming to have sunk the submarine. Early on the morning of 29 August 1942, she was ordered to patrol east of Savo Island, and between 09:00 and 11:00 that day heard a series of distant explosions, probably from the sinking of I-123 by the U.S. Navy destroyer minelayer . Ro-34 returned to Rabaul on 6 September 1942.

Eighth war patrol

Ro-34 began her eighth war patrol on 27 September 1943, headed for a patrol area off Port Moresby. While she was on patrol, Submarine Division 21 was disbanded on 5 October 1942, and she was reassigned directly to Submarine Squadron 7 headquarters that day. On 6 October 1942, she received orders to make her best speed toward Rossel Island. She concluded her patrol with her return to Rabaul on 9 October 1942.

October–November 1942

On 12 October 1942, Ro-34 departed Rabaul and set course for Truk. At Truk, she picked up underwater access tubes and deck mountings for midget submarines, and departed on 29 October 1942 to carry the equipment to an anchorage in the Shortland Islands off Shortland Island, where larger submarines were to use them while serving as mother ships in a planned midget submarine campaign against Allied ships off Guadalcanal. She called at Shortland from 1 to 2 November 1942 to unload the tubes and fittings, then headed for Rabaul, which she reached on 3 November 1942.

Ninth war patrol

Her patrol was uneventful, and she concluded it with her arrival at Truk on 27 November 1942.

December 1942–February 1943

Ro-34 departed Truk on 1 December 1942 and set course for Sasebo, where she arrived on 9 December 1942 and began an overhaul. During a diving test in mid-January 1943, her battery flooded, causing the release of chlorine gas, which poisoned several electricians. After completion of the overhaul, she departed Sasebo on 20 February 1943 and proceeded to Rabaul, which she reached on 4 March 1943. Upon arrival, she was reassigned to Submarine Division 13 in Submarine Squadron 7 in the 8th Fleet.

Tenth war patrol

On 9 March 1943, Ro-34 departed Rabaul on her tenth war patrol, heading for a patrol area in the Solomon Islands off Tulagi. After an uneventful patrol, she returned to Rabaul on 28 March 1943.

Eleventh war patrol

O'Bannon closed the range rapidly, sighted Ro-34 at 02:30, and prepared to ram her, but O′Bannon′s commanding officer, fearing that Ro-34 might be a minelayer, ordered O′Bannon to make a hard turn at the last minute to avoid a collision. O′Bannon passed Ro-34 at such close range that her guns could not depress enough to fire at the submarine. A U.S. Navy legend later held that O′Bannon′s crew instead threw potatoes at crewmen on Ro-34′s deck to keep them from manning their guns in what became known as the "Maine potato episode"; the story later was found to be apocryphal, but it nonetheless has been reported as fact in various historical accounts and on commemorative plaques, and it remains widely believed.

The destroyer crews reported that they saw at least one shell hit Ro-34 before she submerged. O′Bannon closed the range again, and after passing less than  ahead of the submerged Ro-34 fired depth charges from her K-gun depth-charge throwers. The destroyers then lost contact with Ro-34.

At 03:19, O′Bannon regained sonar contact on Ro-34 and dropped a pattern of eight depth charges. Some historians have credited O′Bannon with sinking Ro-34, but Ro-34 survived the encounter.

Loss

Ro-34 was on the surface off San Cristobal on the evening of 7 April 1943 when Strong again made radar contact on her at 21:51 Lima Time at a range of  bearing 150 degrees true from Strong. Strong closed the range and illuminated Ro-34 with her searchlights, then opened fire with her  guns and 40mm and 20mm antiaircraft guns. She scored at least three  shell hits, and Ro-34 assumed a 10-to-15-degree down-angle by the stern and submerged.

On 16 April 1943, Ro-34 was ordered to return to Rabaul, but she did not acknowledge the order. On 2 May 1943, the Imperial Japanese Navy declared her to be presumed lost in the Solomon Islands with her entire crew of 66. The Japanese struck her from the Navy list on 14 July 1943.

Notes

References
 

 

Ro-33-class submarines
Kaichū type submarines
Ships built by Mitsubishi Heavy Industries
1935 ships
World War II submarines of Japan
Japanese submarines lost during World War II
World War II shipwrecks in the Pacific Ocean
Maritime incidents in April 1943
Ships lost with all hands
Submarines sunk by United States warships